Otto Torgersen (16 June 1910 – 12 December 2000) was a Norwegian architect and advertising executive.

Torgersen was born in Trondheim, Norway. He studied advertising and  architecture at Goldsmiths, University of London (1937–38). In 1947, he founded an advertisement and architectural firm, Pran og Torgersen AS,  which he operated jointly in partnership with  Christian Pran, who died in 1961.

Among his architectural designs were the Norwegian Museum of Science and Technology at Etterstad from 1960 and the Norwegian School of Sport Sciences  (Norges idrettshøgskole) at Sognsvann on Kringsjå in Oslo from 1971.

Torgersen was responsible for designing the exhibitions at Norway's Resistance Museum at Akershus Fortress. 
He also contributed to the Kon Tiki Museum and the Fram Museum, both at Bygdøy.
 He was awarded the advertisers prize Gullblyanten in 1969 for his association with  Norway's participation at the Expo 67 at Montreal in 1967, as well as exhibitions at  Barcelona in 1957  and at  Ekeberg in 1959. He died in December 2000 and was buried at Vestre gravlund.

References

1910 births
2000 deaths
People from Trondheim
Alumni of Goldsmiths, University of London
Advertising people
Norwegian marketing people
20th-century Norwegian architects
Burials at Vestre gravlund